Tenali Municipality is the local self-government in Tenali, a city in the Indian state of Andhra Pradesh. It is classified as a special grade municipality.

History 
The municipality was formed in 1909 and was upgraded to special grade municipality in 1965.

Administration 

The present municipal commissioner of the city is Venkata Krishna.

Wards composition

Tenali municipality has a total of 40 election wards. The below table shows the composition of municipal wards with unreserved and reserved wards (women, SC's, ST's and BC's).

Civic works and services 

Most of the city residents rely on borewells for water. For the growing usage by the city residents, the Public Health Department and the municipality undertook a water project, which includes the construction of a head water works reservoir at VSR and NVR College compound, six other overhead service reservoirs and a filtration plant. These are supplied with the Krishna river water from Prakasam Barrage at Sitanagaram.

The city municipality implements two-bin garbage collection and also took up sanitation campaigns like, Mana Tenali-It’s people’s creation for hygiene of the people.

Projects and infrastructure

The notable Satyanarayana VGTMUDA Lake Park (or Chinaravuru Park) on the outskirts is maintained by VGTMUDA (now CRDA). It is home to many floral varieties and was named after the former municipal chairman, Ravi Satyanarayana.

Tenali is one of the seven municipalities, along with Vijayawada and Guntur Municipal Corporations to be a part of a 15 MW waste-to-energy plant project. It is planned to be set up with the collaboration of the JITF Urban Infrastructure Limited.

Awards and achievements
In 2015, the municipality received Green Leaf Awards 2015 in the category of Best Decentralised Solid Waste Management, which was organised by NGO Sukuki Exnora. In the 6th Plasticon Awards 2012, it was awarded Green City of the country for waste segregation management. The city is one among the 31 cities in the state to be a part of water supply and sewerage services mission known as Atal Mission for Rejuvenation and Urban Transformation (AMRUT). In 2015, as per the Swachh Bharat Abhiyan of the Ministry of Urban Development, Tenali Municipality was ranked 166th in the country.

See also
 List of municipalities in Andhra Pradesh

References

1909 establishments in India
Government agencies established in 1909
Urban local bodies in Andhra Pradesh
Government of Tenali
Buildings and structures in Tenali